Hyacienth Diva Mantalaba, better known as Diva Montelaba (born January 14, 1991 in Cebu City, Philippines), is a Filipina actress. She was one of the Final Five in the fifth season of StarStruck, a reality-based talent search show of GMA Network in the Philippines and finished as first runner-up (First Princess).

Early life
She lived in Minglanilla, Cebu before moving to Metro Manila.

Filmography

Television

Television anthologies

As Herself

Movies

References

External links
Diva Montelaba at iGMA.tv

1991 births
Living people
Filipino child actresses
Filipino television actresses
People from Cebu City
Actresses from Cebu
Visayan people
Participants in Philippine reality television series
StarStruck (Philippine TV series) participants
GMA Network personalities
University of San Jose–Recoletos alumni